Humongous means enormous, of monstruous big size.

Humongous may also refer to:

 Humongous (1982 film) is a 1982 horror film.
 Humongous Entertainment, American video game developer
 "Humongous Growth", the fourth episode of season five of the television situation comedy Will & Grace
 Lord Humongous, professional wrestling character who was introduced in Memphis' Mid-South Wrestling
 Humongous Fungus (disambiguation), colloquial names given to large colonies of mushrooms

See also
 Big (disambiguation)
 Giant (disambiguation)
 Large (disambiguation)